In telecommunication, a basic service element (BSE) is: 

 An optional unbundled feature, generally associated with the basic serving arrangement (BSA), that an enhanced-service provider (ESP) may require or find useful in configuring an enhanced service.
 A fundamental (basic) communication network service; an optional network capability associated with a BSA.

BSEs constitute optional capabilities to which the customer may subscribe or decline to subscribe.

References 
 Basic service element at Telecommunications Industry Association's glossary

Telecommunication services